This is a list of the National Register of Historic Places listings in Red River County, Texas.

This is intended to be a complete list of properties and districts listed on the National Register of Historic Places in Red River County, Texas. There are two districts and five individual properties listed on the National Register in the county. Two individually listed properties are Recorded Texas Historic Landmarks including one that is also a State Antiquities Landmark.

Current listings

The publicly disclosed locations of National Register properties and districts may be seen in a mapping service provided.

|}

See also

National Register of Historic Places listings in Texas
Recorded Texas Historic Landmarks in Red River County

References

External links

Red River County, Texas
Red River County
Buildings and structures in Red River County, Texas